America Newton (Dyer Newton; 1835 – 1917) was one of the original African-American pioneers who helped launch the former mining town of Julian, California, in the Cuyamaca Mountains east of San Diego. She was among the earliest female African-American settlers in the area. Newton was a former slave who provided laundry services in Julian during its gold rush days and beyond. She resided in Julian for more than 50 years.

Life
She arrived in Julian in 1872, having come from Independence, Missouri. Newton owned an  homestead near Julian. A gift shop in Julian is named in her memory, as well as a trail located near her cabin. She died of pneumonia in 1917.

Newton operated a laundry service for miners in the town, often delivering the clean clothes herself. Family friend James Cole provided her with the horse and buggy, making her one of the first African-American women to operate a business in the area. She was known as being friendly and talkative.

According to census records, she was married and had a daughter. She outlived her husband.

She is buried in the Julian Cemetery.

References

External links
 Julian Black Historical Society
 Julian Chamber of Commerce
 The Controversy over the Newton Burial Site

1835 births
1917 deaths
19th-century American slaves
People from Julian, California
19th-century African-American women
Deaths from pneumonia in California
People from Independence, Missouri
African-American history of California
20th-century African-American women
20th-century African-American people
American former slaves
19th-century American businesspeople